Guardistallo is a comune (municipality) in the Province of Pisa in the Italian region Tuscany, located about  southwest of Florence and about  southeast of Pisa.

History
During the summer of 1944, it was the theatre of the Guardistallo massacre, carried out by German occupation forces. On 29 June 1944, 61 people were killed and buried in a mass grave. An extra person was wounded in the same occasion and died in the following days.

References

External links

 Official website

Cities and towns in Tuscany